Methane monooxygenase (particulate) is an enzyme with systematic name methane,quinol:oxygen oxidoreductase. This enzyme catalyses the following chemical reaction

 methane + quinol + O2  methanol + quinone + H2O

Methane monooxygenase contains copper. It is membrane-bound enzyme present in methanotrophs.

See also 
 Methane monooxygenase

References

External links 
 

EC 1.14.18